Ezzat-e Pain (also Romanized as ‘Ezzat-e Pā’īn; also known as Kalāteh-ye Cheshmeh Kabūd) is a village in Jazin Rural District, in the Central District of Bajestan County, Razavi Khorasan Province, Iran. At the 2006 census, its population was 23, in 11 families.

References 

Populated places in Bajestan County